Lexington High School is a public high school located in the city of Lexington, Texas in Lee County, United States and classified as a 3A school by the UIL. It is a part of the Lexington Independent School District located in northwest Lee County. In 2015, the school was rated "Met Standard" by the Texas Education Agency.

Athletics
The Lexington Eagles compete in these sports - 

Baseball
Basketball
Cross Country
Football
Golf
Softball
Tennis
Track and Field
Volleyball

State titles
Doak Springs Lincoln (PVIL)
Girls Track - 
1961(B)

Notable alumni

Tim Kleinschmidt (Class of 1975), member of the Texas House of Representatives since 2009 from Lee, Bastrop, Caldwell, Gonzales, and Karnes counties
Earl Cooper (Class of 1976) NFL player - San Francisco 49ers (1980 to 1985) & Los Angeles Raiders (1986)

References

External links
Lexington ISD website

Public high schools in Texas
Schools in Lee County, Texas